Roorback is the ninth studio album by Brazilian heavy metal band Sepultura, released in 2003, through SPV Records.

Album information
The songs "Mind War" and "Bullet the Blue Sky" were released as singles and music videos. The digipak version (released everywhere except the United States) contains the Revolusongs EP and the video for "Bullet the Blue Sky". The album title refers to the "Roorback forgery".

Reception

Sales were down from their previous albums featuring Derrick Green on vocals. However, Roorback received positive reviews and managed to place on Billboards Independent Music Chart at #17, with first week sales of 4,000. SoundScan reported on March 20, 2007 that Roorback has sold over 75,000 units worldwide.

Allmusic's Alex Henderson gave the album 4 stars out of 5 and said that "unrest and political corruption are recurring themes on Roorback", and "the songs that Sepultura wrote paint a consistently bleak and troubling picture of the world". Adrien Begrand from PopMatters called Roorback "their strongest effort in years" and "their most consistent and energized album since Roots".

Track listing

(Digipak version includes a second disc which contains Revolusongs, but excludes the Metallica cover from the original EP)

On the digipack CD version, Outro ends at 1:22. There is silence from 1:23 - 8:22. Starting at 8:23 is a hidden track.

Chart performance 
Album - Billboard (United States)

Credits 
Derrick Green - vocals, rhythm guitar
Andreas Kisser - lead guitar
Paulo Jr. - bass
Igor Cavalera - drums, percussion
João Barone - guest appearance
Sepultura - production
Steve Evetts - production, engineering, mixing
Derek Hess - illustrations
George Marino - mastering
Milky - assistant engineering
Luciano Tarta - assistant engineering
Leo Shogun - assistant engineering
Fabiano Zowa - executive engineering
Jacob Bannon - graphic design

References

Sepultura albums
2003 albums
Albums produced by Steve Evetts
SPV/Steamhammer albums
Nu metal albums by Brazilian artists